Leonard Daniel Hinkley (February 3, 1839May 9, 1918) was an American merchant and Democratic politician.  He was a member of the Wisconsin State Assembly, representing Waukesha County during the 1871 session.  He is said to be the first member of the Wisconsin Legislature to have been born in Wisconsin. His last name is sometimes spelled Hinckley.

Biography
Leonard Hinkley was born February 3, 1839. He was a child of the first American settlers at what is now the town of Eagle, Wisconsin, and he was only the second or third child born in that town.  He was raised and educated there until 1862, when he volunteered for service in the Union Army.

He was enrolled as a private in Company A of the 24th Wisconsin Infantry Regiment, but spent six months as a musician in the regiment band.  He rejoined Company A in May 1863 and remained with the company through the end of the war. The 24th Wisconsin Infantry served in the western theater of the war, and participated in many of the battles in Kentucky, Tennessee, and northern Georgia.

After returning from the war, Hinkley was elected town clerk in 1867, treasurer in 1868 and 1869, and chairman of the town board in 1870. In the fall of 1870, he was elected to the Wisconsin State Assembly running on the Democratic Party ticket.  He represented Waukesha County's first Assembly district, which then comprised much of the southern half of the county.

After the Assembly, Hinkley was employed in the grain business and lived for at least some time in Janesville, Wisconsin, and was a crop inspector on the Chicago, Milwaukee and St. Paul Railroad. He lived for a number of years in South Dakota.

Personal life and family
Leonard Hinkley was the eldest child of Ahira Rockwell "A. R." Hinkley and his wife Mary (née Daniels).  Ahira Hinkley was a native of Grafton County, New Hampshire, and is considered the founder of Eagle, Wisconsin, having located the site and staked his claim there in 1836, along with his brother Henry. The Hinkleys trace their lineage back to the brothers John and Thomas Hinckley, who came to the Plymouth Colony sometime before 1637.  Leonard's father, Ahira, was the first in their line to drop the "c" from the family name.

Electoral history

Wisconsin Assembly (1870)

| colspan="6" style="text-align:center;background-color: #e9e9e9;"| General Election, November 8, 1870

References

1839 births
1918 deaths
People from Eagle, Wisconsin
Democratic Party members of the Wisconsin State Assembly
People of Wisconsin in the American Civil War
Union Army soldiers
19th-century American politicians